SOS Children's Villages - USA is part of SOS Children's Villages, the world's largest nongovernmental organization dedicated to the care of orphaned and abandoned children.  SOS Children's Villages – USA has been in operation since 1969 and has 501(c)(3) tax exempt status. Headquartered in Washington D.C., SOS Children's Villages - USA strives to create awareness and build support for SOS villages around the world.

FOUR PILLARS

SOS Children's Villages – USA works to ensure that every vulnerable and orphaned child has a supporting and loving family. Their four pillars are: 1) Prevention 2) Long-Term Care 3) Empowerment and 4) Advocacy.

 PREVENTION: SOS Children's Villages - USA combines short-term aid and long-term guidance to strengthen families, so they are able to care for their children and protect them from child labor, child trafficking and other threats to their safety. Adverse circumstances like poverty, armed conflict and disease present overwhelming challenges for parents and threaten family stability. When families are at risk of falling apart, children are at a much greater risk of being abused, abandoned or exploited.
 LONG-TERM CARE: SOS Children's Villages - USA builds families for orphaned, abandoned and other vulnerable children throughout the world. The organization works to ensure that all children, together with their siblings, have a loving family and an opportunity to reach their full potential. SOS Children's Villages - USA nurtures the essential feeling of belonging while looking after each child's needs and aspirations.
 EMPOWERMENT: SOS Children's Villages - USA works to build resilience, self-confidence and self-worth to help youth develop mechanisms for protection against life's ups and downs. Education and economic empowerment open the door to self-sufficiency and help young people to become productive, contributing members of their communities.
 ADVOCACY: SOS Children's Villages - USA advocates for child protection and the development of children in a family environment. At local, national and international levels, they sensitize decision makers to the rights and needs of children in order to bring about changes in policies and practices that affect children's lives.

AWARDS

 Save the World Award - 2009: Founded by Mikhail Gorbachev, Save the World Awards are given to organizations and people who promote human welfare or devote themselves to the conservation of the planet. SOS Children's Villages joins other prestigious award winners Oprah Winfrey, Paul McCartney and Steven Spielberg.
 Mother Teresa Gold Medal - 2008: SOS Children's Villages received this award for outstanding contributions to society from the Mother Teresa Research Council.
 Woman of the Year Award - 2005: Some 5,000 women who serve as professional caregivers, or SOS mothers, for around 59,000 children in the care of SOS Children's Villages received the Woman of the Year award in the category of social commitment by the Women's World Forum.
 Conrad N. Hilton Humanitarian Prize - 2002: The Hilton Prize is the world's largest award for humanitarian service. The prestigious $1 million prize is presented annually by the Conrad N. Hilton Foundation and was awarded to SOS Children's Villages for making extraordinary contributions toward alleviating human suffering.
 United Nations Peace Messenger - 1986: In recognition of its commitment to peace and as an expression of appreciation for special efforts made in the context of the International Year of Peace, SOS Children's Villages was honored as a Peace Messenger by the Secretary General of the United Nations.[9]

BOARD OF DIRECTORS

Stuart Grant is the chairman of the board. He has spent the last 25 years as a senior finance executive and CFO in the electronics and bio-pharmaceutical industries. He has been CFO of three public companies, with responsibility, together with leadership teams, for driving growth and profitability across the world. Most recently, he was the CFO of Patheon, a leading service provider to the pharmaceutical and biotech industries. His work has allowed him to travel extensively in Europe. His recent positions have been based in the United States, where he and his family are now citizens.

SOS CHILDREN'S VILLAGES - FLORIDA

SOS Children's Villages Florida is located on an eight-acre cul-de-sac in Coconut Creek, on the border of Broward and Palm Beach counties. The village can provide a home for up to 75 children, many of whom have been given the opportunity to be reunited with their siblings and are able to grow up together in the same SOS family. SOS Children's Villages Florida consists of 12 family houses, the director's house, a community center, a counseling center, an administration building and a playground.

SOS CHILDREN'S VILLAGES - ILLINOIS

SOS Children's Villages Illinois consists for four villages: in Chicago, Lockport Village, Auburn Gresham, and Roosevelt Square. The SOS village in Chicago consists of twelve family homes and four duplexes, which house children and SOS parents. The village can house up to 90 children. In addition, another 24 homes are in the process of being built for moderate-income families through the Chicago Department of Housing's New Homes for Chicago and will round out the scattered site community. The village also has a director's house, administration building and playground.

The centerpiece of the village is a community center that includes day care, and infant and toddler programs, an outpatient therapy center, meeting rooms and administrative offices. Soon, ground will be broken and construction will begin on the center, which will be open to the entire Auburn-Gresham community. Architect Jeanne Gang worked on SOS Children's Villages Lavezzorio Community Center, completed in 2008: a 16,800-square-foot foster care community center on Chicago's South Side.

SOCIAL RETURN OF INVESTMENT

The Social Return of Investment (SROI) of SOS Children's Villages’ programs is compelling, for instance: US$1 investment yields benefits to society of US$4 in Ethiopia, and of US$6 in Swaziland, using conservative assumptions.

External links

References
 

Children's charities based in the United States
Community-building organizations
Charities based in Washington, D.C.
SOS Children's Villages